The Long March (lit. Long Expedition) was a military retreat undertaken by the Red Army of the Chinese Communist Party (CCP), the forerunner of the People's Liberation Army, to evade the pursuit of the National Army of the Chinese Nationalist Party (CNP/KMT). Strictly speaking, the Long March was a series of marches, as various Communist armies in the south escaped to the north and west. However, the most famous began in the Jiangxi province in October 1934 and ended in the Shaanxi province in October 1935. The First Front Army of the Chinese Soviet Republic, led by an inexperienced military commission, was on the brink of annihilation by Generalissimo Chiang Kai-shek's troops in their stronghold in Jiangxi province. The route passed through some of the most difficult terrain of western China by traveling west, then north, to Shaanxi.

The Long March began the ascent to power of Mao Zedong, whose leadership during the retreat gained him the support of the members of the party. The bitter struggles of the Long March, which was completed by only about one-tenth of the force that left Jiangxi (about eight thousand of some hundred thousand), came to represent a significant episode in the history of the CCP, and sealed the personal prestige of Mao and his supporters as the new leaders of the party in the following decades.

Timeline 

 1931: Unofficial founding of the Jiangxi–Fujian Soviet by Mao Zedong and Zhu De.
 1931: December, Zhou Enlai arrived in Ruijin and replaced Mao as leader of the CCP.
 1932: October, at the Ningdu Conference, the majority of CCP military leaders criticized Mao's tactics; Mao was demoted to figurehead status.
 1933: Bo Gu and Otto Braun arrived from the USSR, reorganized the Red Army, and took control of Party affairs. They defeated four encirclement campaigns.
 1933: September 25, the Fifth Encirclement Campaign started. Bo and Braun were eventually defeated.
 1934: October 16, 130,000 soldiers and civilians, led by Bo Gu and Otto Braun, began the Long March.
 1934: November 25 – December 3, Battle of Xiang River.
 1935: January 15–17, Zunyi Conference. The leadership of Bo and Braun was denounced. Zhou became the most powerful person in the Party; Mao became Zhou's assistant.
 1935: June–July, troops under Zhou and Mao met with Zhang Guotao's troops. The two forces disagreed on strategy and separated.
 1935: April 29 – May 8, crossing of the Jinsha River, the upper stream of the Yangtze River.
 1935: May 22, Yihai Alliance, the Red Army allied with the Yi people.
 1935: May 29, CCP forces captured Luding Bridge.
 1935: July, CCP forces crossed the Jade Dragon Snow Mountains.
 1935: August, CCP forces crossed the Zoigê Marsh.
 1935: September 16, CCP forces crossed the Lazikou Pass.
 1935: October 22, three Red Army fronts met in Shaanxi. The Long March ended.
 1935: November, Mao became the leader of the CCP. Zhou became Mao's assistant.

Background

The Red Army in 1934
Although the literal translation of the Chinese Cháng Zhēng is "Long March", official publications of the People's Republic of China refer to it as "The Long March of the Red Army". The Long March most commonly refers to the transfer of the main group of the First (or Central) Red Army, which included the leaders of the CCP, from Yudu in the province of Jiangxi to Yan'an in Shaanxi. In this sense, the Long March lasted from October 16, 1934, to October 19, 1935. In a broader view, the Long March included two other forces retreating under pressure from the Kuomintang: the Second Red Army and the Fourth Red Army. The retreat of all the Red Armies was not complete until October 22, 1935, when the three forces linked up in Shaanxi.

The divisions of the "Chinese Workers' and Peasants' Red Army" (中國工農紅軍) were named according to historical circumstances, not by chronological order. Indeed, early Communist units would often form by defection from existing Kuomintang forces, and they kept their original designations. By the time of the Long March, numerous small units had been organized into three unified groups: the First Red Army (紅一方面軍/红一方面军/Hóng Yī Fāngmiàn Jūn), the Second Red Army (紅二方面軍/红二方面军/Hóng Èr Fāngmiàn Jūn), and the Fourth Red Army (紅四方面軍/红四方面军/Hóng Sì Fāngmiàn Jūn). Some translations refer to these same units as the "First Front Red Army", "Second Front Red Army", and "Fourth Front Red Army" to distinguish them from earlier organizational divisions.

The First Red Army formed from the First, Third and Fifth Army Groups in southern Jiangxi under the command of Bo Gu and Otto Braun. When several smaller units formed the Fourth Red Army under Zhang Guotao in the Sichuan–Shaanxi border area, no standard nomenclature of the armies of the CCP existed; moreover, during the Chinese Civil War, central control of separate Communist-controlled enclaves within China was limited. After the organization of these first two main forces, the Second Red Army formed in eastern Guizhou by unifying the Second and Sixth Army Groups under He Long and Xiao Ke. In this case, a "Third Red Army" was led by He Long, who established his base area in the Hunan–Hubei border. The defeat of his forces in 1932 led to a merge in October 1934 with the 6th Army Corps, led by Xiao Ke, to form the Second Red Army. These three armies would maintain their historical designation as the First, Second and Fourth Red Armies until Communist military forces were nominally integrated into the National Revolutionary Army, forming the Eighth Route Army and the New Fourth Army, during the Second Sino-Japanese War from 1937 to 1945.

Civil War 

The Chinese Communist Party (CCP) was founded in 1921 by Chen Duxiu with Soviet support. The CCP initially collaborated with the Chinese Nationalist Party or Kuomintang (KMT), founded by the revolutionary republican Sun Yat-sen. However, after the unexpected death of Sun in March 1925, a power struggle within the KMT led to the shift in the party's authority to Chiang Kai-shek, whose Northern Expedition forces succeeded in wresting control of large areas of China from local warlords and establishing a unified government in Nanjing in April 1927. Unlike other nationalist leaders, like Wang Jingwei, Chiang was opposed to the idea of continued collaboration with the CCP. The initial period of cooperation to unify China and end the unequal treaties broke up in April 1927 when Chiang Kai-shek struck out against the Communists. Unsuccessful urban insurrections (in Nanchang, Wuhan and Guangzhou) and the suppression of the CCP in Shanghai and other cities drove many party supporters to rural strongholds such as the Jiangxi Soviet, which was organized by Mao Zedong. By 1928, deserters and defecting Kuomintang army units, supplemented by peasants from the Communist rural soviets, formed the Chinese Workers' and Peasants' Red Army. The ideological confrontation between the CCP and the KMT soon evolved into the first phase of the Chinese Civil War.

The Jiangxi Soviet

By 1930, the Communist Red Army had established the Chinese Soviet Republic in the provinces of Jiangxi and Fujian around the city of Ruijin, including industrial facilities.

After the establishment of the Jiangxi Soviet, Mao's status within the Party declined. In 1930, Mao claimed a need to eliminate alleged KMT spies and Anti-Bolsheviks operating inside the Jiangxi Soviet and began an ideological campaign featuring torture and guilt by association, in order to eliminate his enemies. The campaign continued until the end of 1931, killing approximately 70,000 people and reducing the size of the Red Army from 40,000 to less than 10,000. The de facto leader of the party at the time, Zhou Enlai, originally supported Mao's purges as necessary to eliminate KMT spies. After Zhou arrived in Jiangxi in December 1931, he criticized Mao's campaigns for being directed more against anti-Maoists than legitimate threats to the Party, for the campaign's general senselessness, and for the widespread use of torture to extract confessions. During 1932, following Zhou's efforts to end Mao's ideological persecutions, the campaigns gradually subsided.

In December, of 1931 Zhou replaced Mao Zedong as Secretary of the First Front Army and political commissar of the Red Army.  Liu Bocheng, Lin Biao and Peng Dehuai all criticized Mao's tactics at the August 1932 Ningdu Conference.  The most senior leaders to support Mao in 1932 were Zhou Enlai, who had become disillusioned with the strategic leadership of other senior leaders in the Party, and Mao's old comrade, Zhu De.  Zhou's support was not enough, and Mao was demoted to being a figurehead in the Soviet government, until he regained his position later, during the Long March.

Chiang's Encirclement Campaigns

In early 1933, Bo Gu arrived in Jiangxi with the German Comintern adviser Otto Braun and took control of Party affairs. Zhou at this time, apparently with strong support from Party and military colleagues, reorganized and standardized the Red Army. Under Zhou, Bo, and Braun, the Red Army defeated four attacks by Chiang Kai-shek's Nationalist troops.

Chiang's fifth campaign was much more difficult to contain. In September 1933, the National Revolutionary Army under Chiang Kai-shek eventually completely encircled Jiangxi, with the advice and tactical assistance of his German adviser, Hans von Seeckt. A fortified perimeter was established by Chiang's forces, and Jiangxi was besieged in an attempt to destroy the Communist forces trapped within. In July 1934, the leaders of the Party, dominated by the "Twenty-Eight Bolsheviks", a militant group formed in Moscow by Wang Ming and Bo Gu, forced Mao from the Politburo of the CCP in Ruijin and placed him briefly under house arrest. Mao was replaced by Zhou Enlai as leader of the military commission.

Chiang's strategy of slowly constructing a series of interlinking blockhouses (resembling medieval castles) was successful, and Chiang's army was able to capture several major Communist strongholds within months.  Between January and March 1934, the Nationalists advanced slowly.  Bo and Braun continued to employ orthodox military tactics, resulting in a series of Kuomintang advances and heavy Communist casualties.  In October 1934 KMT troops won a decisive battle and drove deep into the heart of the Central Soviet Area.  When Ruijin became exposed to KMT attack, Party leaders faced the choice of either remaining and perishing or of abandoning the base area and attempting to break through the enemy encirclement.

In August 1934, with the Red Army depleted by the prolonged conflict, a spy, Mo Xiong, who had been placed by Zhou Enlai in the KMT army headquarters in Nanchang, brought news that Chiang Kai-shek was preparing a major offensive against the Communist capital, Ruijin. The Communist leadership decided on a strategic retreat to regroup with other Communist units, and to avoid annihilation. The original plan was to link up with the Second Red Army commanded by He Long, thought to be in Hubei to the west and north. Communications between divided groups of the Red Army had been disrupted by the Kuomintang campaign. During the planning to evacuate Jiangxi, the First Red Army was unaware that these other Communist forces were also retreating westward.

The Long March

Escape from Jiangxi

Since the Central Base Area could not be held, the Standing Committee appointed Bo (responsible for politics), Braun (responsible for military strategy), and Zhou (responsible for the implementation of military planning) to organize the evacuation. Since the enemy was close, Zhou, in charge of logistics, made his plans in complete secrecy. It was not disclosed who was to leave or when: even senior leaders were only at the last moments told of the Army's movements. It is not known what criteria were used to determine who would stay and who would go, but 16,000 troops and some of the Communists' most notable commanders at the time (including Xiang Ying, Chen Yi, Tan Zhenlin, and Qu Qiubai) were left to form a rear guard, to divert the main force of Nationalist troops from noticing, and preventing, the general withdrawal.

The first movements to screen the retreat were undertaken by forces led by Fang Zhimin, breaking through Kuomintang lines in June 1934. Although Fang Zhimin's troops were soon destroyed, these movements surprised the Kuomintang, who were numerically superior to the Communists at the time and did not expect an attack on their fortified perimeter.

The early troop movements were actually a diversion to allow the retreat of more important leaders from Jiangxi. On October 16, 1934, a force of about 130,000 soldiers and civilians under Bo Gu and Otto Braun attacked the line of Kuomintang positions near Yudu.  More than 86,000 troops, 11,000 administrative personnel and thousands of civilian porters actually completed the breakout; the remainder, largely wounded or ill soldiers, continued to fight a delaying action after the main force had left, and then dispersed into the countryside. Several prominent members of the Chinese Soviet who remained behind were captured and executed by the Kuomintang after the fall of Ruijin in November 1934, including Qu Qiubai and the youngest brother of Mao Zedong, Mao Zetan.

The withdrawal began in early October 1934.  Zhou's intelligence agents were successful in identifying a large section of Chiang's blockhouse lines that were manned by troops under General Chen Jitang, a Guangdong warlord who Zhou identified as being likely to prefer preserving the strength of his troops over fighting. Zhou sent Pan Hannian to negotiate for safe passage with General Chen, who subsequently allowed the Red Army to pass through the territory that he controlled without fighting. The Red army successfully crossed the Xinfeng River and marched through the province of Guangdong and into Hunan before encountering the last of Chiang's fortifications at the Xiang River.

After passing through three of the four blockhouse fortifications needed to escape Chiang's encirclement, the Red Army was finally intercepted by regular Nationalist troops, and suffered heavy casualties.  Of the 86,000 Communists who attempted to break out of Jiangxi with the First Red Army, only 36,000 successfully escaped. Due to the low morale within the Red Army at the time, it is not possible to know what proportion of these losses were due to military casualties, and which proportion were due to desertion. The conditions of the Red Army's forced withdrawal demoralized some Communist leaders (particularly Bo Gu and Otto Braun), but Zhou remained calm and retained his command. Most Communist losses occurred over only two days of heavy fighting, from November 30 to December 1, 1934.

Determining the direction of the Red Army
After escaping Chiang's encirclement, it was obvious to Party leaders that Chiang was intent on intercepting what remained of the Red Army in Hunan, and the direction of the Red Army's movements had to be reconsidered.  The plan to rendezvous and join He Long's army in Hunan had become too risky. Mao suggested to Zhou that the Red Army change direction, towards Guizhou, where Mao expected enemy defenses to be weak.

A meeting at Tongdao, close to the border of Hunan and Guizhou, was convened to discuss the direction of the Red Army on December 12, 1934.  Zhou endorsed Mao's proposal, encouraging other leaders to overrule the objections of Bo and Braun. Another dispute of the direction of the Red Army occurred soon after, once the Red Army reached Liping, in the mountains of southeast Guizhou. Braun believed that they should travel to eastern Guizhou, but Mao wanted to go to western Guizhou, where he expected KMT forces to be lighter and which borders Sichuan, and to establish a base area there. In a meeting to decide the army's direction, Zhou sided with Mao, making Braun "fly into a rage because he was overruled in the debate." At the meeting it was decided that the Red Army would travel towards Zunyi, in western Guizhou.

On January 1, 1935, the Red Army reached the Wu River. Bo and Braun again insisted the Red Army move back to western Hunan to join other Communist troops in the area, but their prestige had considerably declined by that point, and their suggestion was rejected. Even Zhou had become impatient, and proposed a new rule which was put into effect immediately: that all military plans had to be submitted to the Politburo for approval.  The movement passed, clearly depriving Braun of the right to direct military affairs. On January 15 the Red Army captured Zunyi, the second largest city in Guizhou. As Mao had predicted, the city was weakly defended, and was too far from Nationalist forces to be under immediate threat of attack.  By the time the Red Army occupied Zunyi, it was highly depleted, and counted little more than 10,000 men. Zhou used the peace afforded in Zunyi to call an enlarged Politburo meeting, in order to examine the causes of the Communists' repeated defeats.

The Zunyi Conference

The Communists' Zunyi Conference lasted from January 15–17, 1935, and resulted in a reshuffling of the Party politburo. Zhou intended the conference to draw lessons from the Red Army's past failures, and to develop strategies for the future. Much of the discussion revolved around whether the defeats of the Red Army were due to unavoidable circumstances, or inadequacies of leadership.  Bo Gu, the first speaker, attributed the Red Army's losses to "objective" causes, particularly the enemy's overwhelming numerical superiority, and poor coordination of Communist forces.  Braun's interpreter, Wu Xiuquan, later recalled that Bo's arguments did not impress his audience, and that Bo came across as someone attempting to avoid responsibility.

Zhou Enlai was the next to speak. Zhou blamed the Red Army's failures on poor decisions at the leadership level, and blamed himself as one of the three people most responsible.  Zhou's willingness to accept responsibility was well received. Zhang Wentian, basing many of his conclusions on recent discussions with Mao, attacked Bo and Braun directly, criticizing them for numerous strategic and tactical errors.

After Zhang, Mao gave a speech in which he analyzed the poor tactics and strategies of the two leaders. With Zhou's explicit backing, Mao won over the meeting. Seventeen of the meeting's twenty participants (the exceptions being Bo, Braun, and He Kequan) argued in his favor.

Of the three leaders who had controlled the Party before the Zunyi Conference, only Zhou Enlai's political career survived. Zhou was held partially responsible for the Red Army's defeat, but was retained at the top level of Party leadership because of his differences with Bo and Braun at Ningdu, his successful tactics in defeating Chiang's fourth Encirclement Campaign, and his resolute support of Mao. Although the failed leadership of Bo Gu and Otto Braun was denounced, Mao was not able to win the support of a sufficient number of Party leaders to gain outright power at the conference.

A major shift in the Party's leadership occurred two months later, in March 1935. Mao was passed over for the position of General Secretary by Zhang Wentian, but gained enough influence to be elected one of three members of Military Affairs Commission. The other two members were Zhou Enlai, who retained his position as Director of the commission, and Wang Jiaxiang, whose support Mao had enlisted earlier.  Within this group, Zhou was empowered to make the final decisions on military matters, while Mao was Zhou's assistant.  Wang was in charge of Party affairs.

Escaping Chiang's pursuit

When the army resumed its march northward, the direct route to Sichuan was blocked by Chiang's forces. Mao's forces spent the next several months maneuvering to avoid direct confrontation with hostile forces, but still attempting to move north to join Zhang Guotao's Fourth Red Army. While Chiang's armies approached Mao in northern Guizhou from three directions, Mao maneuvered out of the encirclement by crossing the Chishui River four times. Then, Mao led the Red Army, crossing the Wu River and marching towards Guiyang. He feigned an attack to this city when Chiang was visiting. Chiang ordered his army in Kunming to move eastward to save Guiyang, but the Red Army turned towards Kunming immediately and entered Yunnan, where the Yangtze River was lightly guarded.

In February 1935, Mao's wife, He Zizhen, gave birth to a daughter. Because of the harsh conditions, the infant was left with a local family.

The Communist forces were harassed by both the Kuomintang and local warlords. To avoid a fatal confrontation, Zhou and Mao maneuvered the Red army south and west, through Guizhou, Sichuan, and Yunnan, feigning attacks on Guiyang and Kunming to disguise their movements. The First Red Army crossed the Yangtze (the section of Jinsha River) on May 9, 1935, finally escaping determined pursuit, but still had to deal with dangerous mountain passes at heights of up to 4,000 meters, rough climatic conditions, shortages of food, clothing, and equipment, and tribes of local ethnic groups hostile to Chinese encroachment. The Red Army had to capture river crossings defended by warlords and Nationalist troops. The most famous was Luding Bridge, extolled in official history as an heroic triumph, although many historians now believe that the difficulty of the battle was exaggerated or that the incident was fabricated for propaganda purposes.

Conflict with ethnic warlords
Warlords often refused to help out the Kuomintang against the Communist Red Army, preferring to save their own forces.

300 "Khampa bandits" were enlisted into the Kuomintang's Consolatory Commission military in Sichuan, where they were part of the effort of the central government of China to penetrate and destabilize the local Han warlords such as Liu Wenhui. The Chinese government sought to exercise full control over frontier areas against the warlords. Liu had refused to do battle with the Red Army, to save his own military from destruction. The Consolatory Commission forces were used to battle the Communist Red Army, but were defeated when their religious leader was captured by Communist forces.

Communist forces on the Long March clashed against Kham rebels in the 1934 Khamba Rebellion, who were fleeing from Tibetan government forces.

The Fourth Red Army
In June–July 1935, the troops under Mao united with the Fourth Red Army, led by Zhang Guotao, which had retreated west from Henan. Zhang had taken a different route of evacuation, and arrived at Lianghekou with 84,000 troops in relatively good condition. The fact that he had control of superior forces gave him the power to challenge the authority of Zhou and Mao, whose power was based largely on the Party's support. Zhang demanded that one of his own generals, Chen Changhao, take over Zhou's position as political commissar of the entire Red Army, and suggested that Zhang himself replace Zhu De on the Military Commission.  Zhang argued that such a reorganization would create a more "equal" army organization.  On July 18, Zhou relinquished his position as political commissar, and several leading positions were taken over by generals of the Fourth Red Army.

These changes had no long-term significance because Zhang and Mao disagreed with the direction of the army. Zhang insisted on going southwest, while Mao insisted on going northwards, towards Shaanxi. No agreement was reached, and the two armies eventually split, each going their separate ways.

Zhang Guotao's Fourth Red Army took a different route than Mao, travelling south, then west, and finally north through China. On the way Zhang's forces were largely destroyed by the forces of Chiang Kai-shek and his Chinese Muslim allies, the Ma clique. The remnants of Zhang's forces later rejoined elements of the Second Red Army before eventually linking up with Mao's forces in Shaanxi.

The Second Red Army

The Second Red Army began its own withdrawal west from Hubei in November 1935, led by He Long, who commanded the KMT Twentieth Army in 1923 before joining the CCP. For retribution Chiang Kai-Shek had He Long's relatives executed, including three sisters and a brother. In 1932 he established a soviet in the Hunan-Jiangxi border area, and in August 1934 received command of the Second Red Army, establishing a base in Hubei. An advance party of the First Red Army, called the Sixth Corps, commanded by Xiao Ke, was sent towards the Second Red Army two months before the beginning of the Long March. Xiao Ke's force would link up with He Long and his army, but lost communication with the First Army that came behind. It was at this point that Li Zhen's unit was assigned to He Long's command, having already served in the Sixth Corps.

On November 19, 1935, the Second Red Army set out on its own Long March. He Long's force was driven further west than the First Red Army, all the way to Lijiang in Yunnan province, then across the Jade Dragon Snow Mountain massif and through the Tibetan highlands of western Sichuan. He Long and Xiao Ke were married to sisters who also accompanied the army. He Long's wife, Jian Xianren, carried the baby daughter she had given birth to three weeks before the retreat began. Jian Xianfo gave birth to a son in the desolate swamps of northern Sichuan. Forces of the Second Army detained two European missionaries, Rudolf Bosshardt and Arnolis Hayman, for 16 months. Bosshardt later related his account of the details of daily life on the Long March in a book.

Union of the three armies
Mao's First Red Army traversed several swamps and was attacked by Muslim Hui Ma clique forces under Generals Ma Bufang and Ma Buqing. Finally, in October 1935, Mao's army reached Shaanxi province and joined with local Communist forces there, led by Liu Zhidan, Gao Gang, and Xu Haidong, who had already established a Soviet base in northern Shaanxi. The remnants of Zhang's Fourth Red Army eventually rejoined Mao in Shaanxi, but with his army destroyed, Zhang, even as a founding member of the CCP, was never able to challenge Mao's authority. After an expedition of almost a year, the Second Red Army reached Bao'an (Shaanxi) on October 22, 1936, known in China as the "union of the three armies", and the end of the Long March.

All along the way, the Communist Army confiscated property and weapons from local warlords and landlords, while recruiting peasants and the poor. Nevertheless, only some 8,000 troops under Mao's command, the First Front Army, ultimately made it to the final destination of Yan'an in 1935. Of these, less than 7,000 were among the original 100,000 soldiers who had started the march. A variety of factors contributed to the losses including fatigue, hunger and cold, sickness, desertion, and military casualties.  During the retreat, membership in the party fell from 300,000 to around 40,000.

In November 1935, shortly after settling in northern Shaanxi, Mao officially took over Zhou Enlai's leading position in the Red Army.  Following a major reshuffling of official roles, Mao became the chairman of the Military Commission, with Zhou and Deng Xiaoping as vice-chairmen. (After Zhang Gutao reached Shaanxi, Deng was replaced by Zhang).  This marked Mao's position as the pre-eminent leader of the Party, with Zhou in a position second to Mao.  Both Mao and Zhou would retain their positions until their deaths, in 1976.

Aftermath

While costly, the Long March gave the CCP the isolation it needed, allowing its army to recuperate and rebuild in the north. It also was vital in helping the CCP to gain a positive reputation among the peasants due to the determination and dedication of the surviving participants of the Long March. Mao wrote in 1935:
The Long March is a manifesto. It has proclaimed to the world that the Red Army is an army of heroes, while the imperialists and their running dogs, Chiang Kai-shek and his like, are impotent. It has proclaimed their utter failure to encircle, pursue, obstruct and intercept us. The Long March is also a propaganda force. It has announced to some 200 million people in eleven provinces that the road of the Red Army is their only road to liberation.

In addition, policies ordered by Mao for all soldiers to follow, the Eight Points of Attention, instructed the army to treat peasants respectfully and pay fairly for, rather than confiscate, any goods, in spite of the desperate need for food and supplies. This policy won support for the Communists among the rural peasants.

Hostilities ceased while the Nationalists and Chinese Communists formed a nominal alliance during the Second Sino-Japanese War from 1937 until 1945. During these years, the CCP persevered and strengthened its influence. The Red Army fought a disciplined and organized guerilla campaign against superior Japanese forces, allowing it to gain experience. Following the end of World War II, the resurgent Communist Eighth Route Army, later called the People's Liberation Army, returned to drive the Kuomintang out of Mainland China to the island of Taiwan. Since the establishment of the People's Republic of China in 1949, the Long March has been glorified as an example of the CCP's strength and resilience.

The Long March solidified Mao's status as the undisputed leader of the CCP, though he did not officially become party chairman until 1943. Other survivors of the March also went on to become prominent party leaders well into the 1990s, including Zhu De, Lin Biao, Liu Shaoqi, Dong Biwu, Ye Jianying, Li Xiannian, Yang Shangkun, Zhou Enlai and Deng Xiaoping.

As of 2016, only one survivor of the Long March, Tu Tongjin, a 102-year old neurosurgeon from Fujian and one of just three Red Army soldiers to have earned a doctorate is known to still be alive.

The March in popular culture 
The Chinese government produced a movie in 2006, My Long March, relating personal experiences of a fictional participant in the Long March. The movie, released in celebration of the 71st year since the end of the March, was the second of three movies in the Axis of War movie series, retelling the events stretching from the Battle of the Xiang River up to the Battle of Luding Bridge.

Historical controversies
The Long March is surrounded by conflicting accounts of what occurred.  Some critics and researchers call the earlier accounts myths, but find that they are difficult to prove or disprove because the Chinese government prevents independent historians from exploring the topic.  The few who were able to perform research recently struggle with the fact that many years have gone by since the march took place. Many of the survivors are no longer alive or able to accurately recall events.

Length
In 2003, controversy arose about the distance covered by Mao's First Front Army in the Long March. The figure of 25,000 li (12,500 kilometres or about 8,000 miles) was Mao's estimate, quoted by his biographer Edgar Snow in Red Star Over China, published not long after the end of the Long March in 1938. In 2003, two British researchers, Ed Jocelyn and Andrew McEwen, retraced the route in 384 days, and in their 2006 book "The Long March" estimated the March actually covered about 6,000 km (3,700 miles or 11,154 li). Chinese media, Beijing Daily disputed their report: "The 25,000 li of the Red Army's Long March are a historic fact." Beijing Daily proved that even the First Red Army, which had the least walking distance, travelled closer to 18,088 li (9,375 km or 6,000 miles), and the two British young men did not follow the route in those years. In 2005, Xiaoai Zhang, the daughter of Aiping Zhang and David Ben Uziel, Israeli soldier and photographer, retraced the route again and recorded around 24,000 km.

Luding Bridge

The Battle of Luding Bridge has been portrayed as a glorious and heroic moment in Chinese Communist history, analogous to the Texan Battle of the Alamo.  The official account of the battle depicts exhausted and depleted Communist forces in a desperate situation, where they must fight across a bridge that is guarded by the numerically superior forces of Chiang Kai-shek and his warlord allies.  The Communists send a small volunteer force that braves a hail of gunfire to climb across the bridge on underlying chains and assault the enemy positions on the other side, hence securing the bridgehead for the rest of the army to cross.

However, there is evidence that differs from the official account of the battle. This suggests that much of the fighting was dramatized by Communist leaders for propaganda purposes. Authors Andrew McEwen and Ed Jocelyn who retraced the route of the Long March, interviewing survivors along the way, said that a woman in her early 80s recalled that local people led the way across the bridge and were all shot and killed.  Author Sun Shuyun quotes a witness who said that there was a small enemy force on the other side armed with guns that could "only fire a few metres". They panicked and fled.

Legacy

Use as propaganda
The writer Sun Shuyun writes that generations of Chinese have been taught a glorious account of the Long March in order to justify Mao's Revolution: "If you find it hard," they were told:

think of the Long March; if you feel tired, think of our revolutionary forebears. The message has been drilled into us so that we can accomplish any goal set before us by the party because nothing compares in difficulty with what they did. Decades after the historical one, we have been spurred on to ever more Long Marches – to industrialize China, to feed the largest population in the world, to catch up with the West, to reform the socialist economy, to send men into space, to engage with the 21st century. 

October 2006 marked the 70th anniversary of the end of the Long March. Dozens of newly released, government approved books were displayed in bookstores, with the intention of showing the heroic actions and drama of the Long March. Chinese television presented "a feast of Long March-themed entertainment, including a 20-part drama series, documentaries, and even a song-and-dance extravaganza".

Commentators in the West more often focus on negative aspects of the Long March, such as rumors of the Red Army recruiting local people through kidnapping and blackmail. Sun Shuyun interviewed a man who said he was barely into his teens when he was forced to join the Red Army. This veteran only joined the Red Army because his father was arrested by the Communists and would not be released until the man agreed to join the army. The man later thought of deserting, but stayed on because he feared being caught and executed. In order to escape starvation, the Red Army often stole food from villagers in the remote locations it traveled through.

Use as namesake
Vietnamese communist political leader and revolutionary Trường Chinh (1907 – 1988). Trường Chinh was born as Đặng Xuân Khu, but changed his name to Trường Chinh (meaning Long March) in honor of the Long March. 
Chinese Long March rocket family, a series of expendable launch system operated by the China National Space Administration (CNSA), are named after the Long March. 
Chinese Nuclear submarines, starting from Type 091 class, are named after the Long March.

See also
 History of China
 History of the Republic of China
 History of the People's Republic of China
 List of Battles of Chinese Civil War
 Military of the People's Republic of China
 Military of the Republic of China
 National Revolutionary Army
 People's Liberation Army
 Warlord Era
 Whampoa Military Academy

Notes

References

Further reading

 

 Young, Helen Prager (2000). Choosing Revolution: Chinese Women Soldiers on the Long March. University of Illinois Press, pp. 282 pages.

External links 

General Information
Key events of the Long March – Account of the Long March by the China Daily
Retracing Mao's Long March – Report on the modern expeditions by Jocelyn & McEwen along the Long March routes
The Myth of the 'Turning-Point': Towards a New Understanding of the Long March – Article from 'Bochumer Jahrbuch zur Ostasienforschung' (2001)

Illustrations, Maps & Posters
Map of primary route – Locations of the First Front Army route with dates
Long March routes of the Communist armies – Routes of the First, Second and Fourth Front Armies
Site of the Zunyi Conference – Photo and description of the building in which the landmark 1935 politburo meeting was held
Luding Bridge  – Chinese propaganda posters depicting the battle for Luding Bridge

Commemorations
"Marking the 70th anniversary of the victory of the Red Army's Long March" – PLA Daily (Peoples Liberation Army newspaper) web portal
Art on a Long March – A contemporary art exhibition presented for the public at sites along the route of Mao's Long March.

Conflicts in 1934
Conflicts in 1935
Military operations of the Chinese Civil War
Marching
1934 in China
1935 in China
Mao Zedong
Military history of Jiangxi
Chinese Soviet Republic